Muhlenbergia glomerata is a species of grass known as spiked muhly and marsh muhly. It is native to North America, where it occurs across Canada and the northern half of the United States.

Description
This grass produces branching stems up to 1.2 meters tall from a network of rhizomes. The inflorescence is a narrow panicle of spikelets which are up to 8 millimeters long.

Distribution and habitat
This North American grass is found in moist areas in various habitat types. It grows in bogs, marshes, meadows, ditches, fens, swamps, riversides and lakeshores, hot springs, wet forests, alvars, and seasonally flooded land. It occurs in cooler, more moist places than many other C4 species. It occurs less often in dry places.

References

glomerata
Flora of Canada
Flora of the United States
Plants described in 1824